Joan Baez in Concert (later reissued as Joan Baez in Concert, Part 1) is a live album taken from Joan Baez's 1962 concert tours. It peaked at #10 on the Billboard Pop Albums chart.

History
It was Baez's version of "Babe, I'm Gonna Leave You" that brought the song to Jimmy Page and Robert Plant's attention; the song is now more commonly associated with Page and Plant's band Led Zeppelin. Malvina Reynolds' "What Have They Done to the Rain" (about nuclear fallout) was the first "topical" song Baez ever recorded. "Até Amanhã" is a Brazilian love song and is sung entirely in Portuguese.

Vanguard released most of this album plus its subsequent companion album Joan Baez in Concert, Part 2 on CD in 1988 under this same title, Joan Baez in Concert. Length constraints required dropping some tracks; the CD reissue includes just 20 of the 28 tracks on the two vinyl releases. Dropped from the single CD release were "Babe, I'm Gonna Leave You", "Pretty Boy Floyd", "Lady Mary", "Até Amanhã", "Matty Groves", "Three Fishers", "Hush Little Baby" and "Battle Hymn of the Republic".

A 2002 Vanguard reissue includes the original Part 1 vinyl tracklist plus three previously unreleased tracks, "Streets of Laredo", "My Good Old Man" and "My Lord What A Morning."

Reception 

In his Allmusic review, music critic Tom Semioli wrote the album's reissue "captures the undisputed queen of folk music at the onset of her fabled career. Featuring 20-bit remastering from the original analog tapes, exact replicas of the original artwork and liner notes, previously unreleased cuts, and additional liner notes, this installment of Vanguard's Original Master Series is a historic collection of contemporary and traditional folk."

Track listing
All songs traditional, except where noted.

Personnel
Joan Baez – vocals, acoustic guitar
Reice Hamel - Recording Engineer

Charts

Certifications

References

1962 live albums
Joan Baez live albums
Albums produced by Maynard Solomon
Live folk albums
Vanguard Records live albums